The 2018 O'Reilly Auto Parts 500 was a Monster Energy NASCAR Cup Series race held on April 8, 2018, at Texas Motor Speedway in Fort Worth, Texas. Contested over 334 laps on the 1.5-mile (2.4 km) intermediate quad-oval, it was the seventh race of the 2018 Monster Energy NASCAR Cup Series season.

Report

Background

Texas Motor Speedway is a speedway located in the northernmost portion of the U.S. city of Fort Worth, Texas – the portion located in Denton County, Texas. The track measures  around and is banked 24 degrees in the turns, and is of the oval design, where the front straightaway juts outward slightly. The track layout is similar to Atlanta Motor Speedway and Charlotte Motor Speedway (formerly Lowe's Motor Speedway). The track is owned by Speedway Motorsports, Inc., the same company that owns Atlanta and Charlotte Motor Speedways, as well as the short-track Bristol Motor Speedway.

Entry list

First practice

Qualifying

Kurt Busch scored the pole for the race with a time of 27.360 and a speed of  after only one round of qualifying was completed due to lightning in the area.

Qualifying results

Practice (post-qualifying)

Second practice

Final practice

Race

First stage
Kurt Busch led the field to green at 2:10 p.m., and the first caution flew on lap 4 when Austin Dillon, Daniel Suárez, Paul Menard and Alex Bowman were involved in an accident in turn four.

The race restarted on lap 7, The second caution of the race flew on lap 82 when  Martin Truex Jr. spun out, Truex was running second to Harvick when his right front tire blew entering Turn 4.

Second stage
The race restarted on lap 91 and stayed green for the start of stage 2, Kyle Larson was making up for a bad start after having to start the race at the back of the field after failing pre-race inspection. That all changed on Lap 128 with Larson running second. He blew a right front tire and crashed hard into the Turn 2 wall, bringing out the third caution of the race.

The race restarted on lap 135, Kyle Busch passed his brother Kurt Busch  to win his second stage of the season. Kurt Busch finished second followed by Joey Logano, Jones, Clint Bowyer, Chase Elliott, Keselowski, Stenhouse, Hamlin and Almirola, The fourth caution flew again for the conclusion of the second stage

Final stage

The race restarted on lap 178 and the fifth caution flew for a seven-car wreck, The final stage got off to a rough start as Hamlin and Aric Almirola made contact  which sent Hamlin spinning back and collecting both Keselowski and Johnson.

The seven-car incident, which also collected Austin Dillon, brought out a red flag that stopped the race for more than 11 minutes with Jones leading the race.

Racing resumed on lap 184.

The seventh caution flew when Trevor Bayne and Kasey Kahne were involved in an accident in turn four.

The race restarted on lap 258, Busch and Harvick went side by side with Ricky Stenhouse Jr. and Darrell Wallace Jr. behind them, and the eighth caution flew when Ryan Newman hit the wall in turn 1.

The race restarted on lap 305.

Kyle Busch edging Kevin Harvick for his first victory of the season.

Harvick, gunning for his fourth victory of 2018, finished three-tenths of a second behind. Busch, who won the second stage, led for 116 laps, while Harvick, who dominated the first stage, led 87.

Post-race

Driver comments
“(Harvick) was probably just a tick faster overall, but I just had to make sure I did everything I could to hit all my marks and everything, and did the right things to block his air and everything, but this Camry was really awesome today," Busch said in victory lane.

"This has been a trying couple of months, you know? After Daytona, we’ve just been on a roll of finishing real good and been really pumped and excited about that and the momentum we were able to carry, but frustrated at the same time trying to get to victory lane," added Busch, who finished second in three of the first six races of 2018.

Stage Results

Stage 1
Laps: 85

Stage 2
Laps: 85

Final Stage Results

Stage 3
Laps: 164

Race statistics
 Lead changes: 8 among different drivers
 Cautions/Laps: 8 for 48
 Red flags: 1 for 11 minutes and 5 seconds
 Time of race: 3 hours, 32 minutes and 7 seconds
 Average speed:

Media

Television
Fox Sports covered their 18th race at the Texas Motor Speedway. Mike Joy, 2009 race winner Jeff Gordon and Darrell Waltrip had the call in the booth for the race. Jamie Little, Vince Welch and Matt Yocum handled the pit road duties for the television side.

Radio
The race was broadcast on radio by the Performance Racing Network and simulcast on Sirius XM NASCAR Radio.

Standings after the race

Drivers' Championship standings

Manufacturers' Championship standings

Note: Only the first 16 positions are included for the driver standings.
. – Driver has clinched a position in the Monster Energy NASCAR Cup Series playoffs.

References

O'Reilly Auto Parts 500
O'Reilly Auto Parts 500
2010s in Fort Worth, Texas
O'Reilly Auto Parts 500
NASCAR races at Texas Motor Speedway